American country music group Little Big Town has released ten studio albums and 27 singles.

Little Big Town released their self-titled debut album on Monument Nashville in 2002, though they only managed one top 40 hit on the Billboard Hot Country Songs chart. They returned in 2005 with The Road to Here, which was released on Equity Music Group. It produced four top 20 hits, including "Boondocks" and "Bring It on Home," both of which reached the top 10. They followed it with A Place to Land, though the lead single, "I'm with the Band", was unsuccessful and the group was left without a label shortly after the album's release when Equity folded. Little Big Town was quickly re-signed by Capitol Nashville, who re-released A Place to Land and promoted two more singles from it. In 2010, Little Big Town scored their first top 10 hit in four years with "Little White Church", the lead single to their fourth studio album, The Reason Why. Their fifth studio album, Tornado, was released on September 11, 2012 and lead single "Pontoon" became their first number one hit. The second single, the title track, reached number 2 on the Country Airplay chart in 2013.

Studio albums

Compilation albums

Singles

As lead artist

As featured artist

Other singles

Promotional singles

Other charted songs

Other appearances

Music videos
All of Little Big Town's singles have featured music videos (except "The Reason Why"). The video for "Life in a Northern Town" was filmed live in concert.

Notes

References

Country music discographies
Discographies of American artists